Super Model is a 2013 Hindi thriller featuring Veena Malik and Ashmit Patel in the lead roles. The supporting cast includes Harsh Chhaya and Jackie Shroff.  It was released worldwide on 27 September.

Plot
Every girl harbors a secret desire to make it big in the glamorous world of showbiz and becoming a hot shot model is one of the obvious routes to fame and glory. However, many such aspirants tend to overlook the struggle, competition and politics associated with this challenging profession.

Super Model depicts their moment of glory. The story revolves around five models who participate in a bikini calendar shoot contest in the Fiji Islands to fulfill their dream of becoming a super model. 
When they reach the islands, rival games start and all the models get trapped in a conspiracy which is set off by the murder of one of the contestants. It is the journey of aspiring models into the fashion industry. It is about the professional and personal struggle that middle class girls have to go through to finally achieve.

A wine baron (Harsh Chhaya) is scouting for Super Models to endorse & launch his new wine brand in the market. He recruits a photographer (Ashmit Patel) to organize a talent hunt in Fiji for the same. A midst this backdrop, an upcoming model (Veena Malik) faces competition from other beauties for the endorsement deal until the contestants mysteriously start getting murdered one by one and the needle of blame seems to point towards her!

Cast
 Ashmit Patel as Vijay Malia/Monty
 Veena Malik as Rupali
 Harsh Chhaya as Dev Walia
 Bobby Darling as Bobby
 Adi Irani as Rohit
 Jackie Shroff
 Nataliya Kozhenova
 Aparna Jadhav
 Sana Oberoi
 Manu Rajappq
 Vishakha Gupta
 Prabha Ali
 Wahid Ali

Soundtrack

Controversy
Veena Malik, Pakistani actress claimed that the poster of the Poonam Pandey starrer, Nasha is a copy of her film, SuperModel. She claims that the poster of her movie is original and was shot 9 months before the release of the film. She also said that she hopes the sequences of her film are safe until the release.

Another controversy revolving around her is that she has worn too many bikinis in the film and doesn't intend on wearing it ever again.

Critical reception
Super Model was panned by critics upon release.

References

Super Model (2013) Movie details at Previews Nation

External links
 
 

Films shot in Fiji
2010s Hindi-language films
Films about modeling